is a 2013 Japanese film directed by Ryūichi Hiroki.

Cast
Aoi Miyazaki as Aiko Tsumari 
Osamu Mukai as Ayumu Muko 
Tatsuomi Hamada
Himeka Asami
Miyu Honda
Akira Emoto 
Chieko Matsubara 
Lily Franky
Tamaki Ogawa
Ren Osugi as Sotetsu (voice)
Tasuku Emoto as Kosoku (voice)
Sakura Ando as Kanyu (voice)
Kengo Kora (voice)

References

External links

2013 films
Films based on Japanese novels
Films directed by Ryūichi Hiroki
2010s Japanese films
2010s Japanese-language films